Mohamed Hussein Maidane  is a Somali politician. He was the Mayor of Borama, the capital and the largest city of  Awdal region in Somaliland.

Career
Maidane is a member of the Peace, Unity, and Development Party (Kulmiye), the ruling political association in the Somaliland region. Maidane was elected as replacement leader on June 24, 2015 by 13 municipal councilors.

References

Living people
Ethnic Somali people
People from Awdal
Mayors of places in Somaliland
Year of birth missing (living people)